Geneva Airport railway station is a train station located underground next to the terminal building of Geneva International Airport (IATA code: GVA), in Grand-Saconnex, Geneva, Switzerland. It is located at the end of the standard gauge Lausanne–Geneva line of Swiss Federal Railways.

The station is 250 metres away from the airport terminal via a covered walkway, and very close to the Palexpo fairground.

Services
The station is a terminus station served by an average of five trains an hour. They all call at Geneva main station (Genève-Cornavin) (6 minutes away) and continue to Lausanne, Neuchâtel, Fribourg, Biel/Bienne, Soluthurn, Bern, Lucerne, Zurich, Winterthur, St. Gallen, and/or the Valais Alps (Sion & Brig):

 InterCity
 (Hourly) to St. Gallen via Lausanne, Fribourg, Bern, Zurich, Zurich Airport, and Winterthur.
 (Hourly) to  via Morges, Yverdon-les-Bains, Neuchâtel, Biel/Bienne, Soluthurn, Olten, Aarau, and Zürich.
 InterRegio
 (Hourly) to Lucerne via Nyon, Morges, Lausanne, Palézieux, Romont, Fribourg, Bern, Zofingen, and Sursee.
 (Half-hourly) to Brig via Nyon (only hourly), Morges (only hourly), Lausanne, Vevey, Montreux, Aigle, St-Maurice (only hourly), Martigny, Sion, Sierre/Siders, Leuk (only hourly), and Visp.

References

External links

 
 
 Interactive station plan (Genève Aéroport)

Airport railway stations in Switzerland
Railway stations in the canton of Geneva
Swiss Federal Railways stations
Railway stations in Switzerland opened in 1987